Mikhail Karlovich Levandovsky (15 May 1890 – 29 July 1938) was a Soviet Komandarm 2nd rank.  He fought in World War I in the Imperial Russian Army and in the Russian Civil War in the Soviet Red Army. He participated in the Soviet invasions of Georgia and Azerbaijan. He commanded forces in both the Caucasus and Siberia.

During the Great Purge, he was arrested on 23 February 1938 and later executed.

Decorations
Order of Saint Stanislaus (1916)
Order of the Red Banner (1920)
Order of Lenin (1935)

References

Bibliography 
 Great Soviet Encyclopedia, XIV, Moscow 1973.
 W. M. Ivanov, Marshal Tukhachevsky, Wojeizdat, Moscow 1990.

1890 births
1938 deaths
Military personnel from Tbilisi
People from Tiflis Governorate
Recipients of the Order of Lenin
Recipients of the Order of the Red Banner
Russian military personnel of World War I
Soviet military personnel of the Russian Civil War
Great Purge victims from Georgia (country)
People executed by the Soviet Union
People from the Russian Empire of Polish descent
Soviet people of Polish descent